The 2003–04 Hawaii Rainbow Warriors basketball team represented the University of Hawaiʻi at Mānoa in the 2003–04 NCAA Division I men's basketball season. The Rainbow Warriors, led by head coach Riley Wallace, played their home games at the Stan Sheriff Center in Honolulu, Hawaii, as members of the Western Athletic Conference.

Hawaii failed to qualify for the NCAA tournament, but was seleted to participate in the NIT, the school's fourth consecutive appearance in the postseason. The Rainbow Warriors won their first game against , the first road victory over a ranked opponent in school history. Hawaii won again to advance to the NIT quarterfinals, but were eliminated by eventual NIT champion Michigan, 88–73.

Roster 

Source

Schedule and results

|-
!colspan=9 style=|Preseason

|-
!colspan=9 style=|Regular season

|-
!colspan=9 style=| WAC tournament

|-
!colspan=9 style=| NIT

Source

References

Hawaii Rainbow Warriors basketball seasons
Hawaii
Hawaii
Hawaii men's basketball
Hawaii men's basketball